Koyapillil Mathai Matthew (1930–2004) also known as Father K.M. Matthew was an Indian Jesuit priest and botanist. He extensively studied the floral diversity of Tamil Nadu, and published several research papers and books. In 1967, he established the Rapinat Herbarium at St. Joseph's College, Tiruchirappalli.

Early life and work

He was born to Koyapillil Ouseph Mathai and Koyapillil John Teresa on March 16, 1930 in Ramapuram, Kottayam, Kerala, India. Born into a family of farmers he completed his school education at St. Augustine's High School, Ramapuram, initial collage studies at SB College Chegannacherry and moved to Tiruchirapalli for higher studies.
He did his bachelor's degree in University of Madras, India and completing his M.Sc. degree during 1958-60, he acquired his doctorate (1960–62) on the alien plants of the Palni hills with the guidance of Hermenegild Santapau and he did his Doctor of Philosophy from University of Bombay in 1963. He also did Master of Science in 1973 from University Reading, United Kingdom.

He extensively carried out field work in Tamil Nadu and this effort resulted in a four-volume The Flora of Tamil Nadu Carnatic. A total of 2020 species was covered in this work. Another contribution is an illustrated Flora entitled the Flora of the Palani Hills in three volumes. He described four new species, one subspecies, and proposed quite a few new combinations. Strobilanthes matthewiana R.W. Scotland has been published in his honour,.

Awards
He was awarded the Best Teacher Award of the Tamil Nadu State Government in 1989, ZWO fellowship of the Dutch Government, Leiden, 1978. He was conferred with the Indira Gandhi Paryavaran Puraskar for 2002 under the `individual' category posthumously for his outstanding contribution for the environmental protection.

Authority name

Publications

References

External links
 Biographical sketch

1930 births
2004 deaths
20th-century Indian botanists
20th-century Indian Jesuits